The 2010 Illinois gubernatorial election took place on November 2, 2010. Incumbent Democratic Governor Pat Quinn was elected to a full term in office, having become governor in 2009 following the impeachment and removal of Governor Rod Blagojevich. Quinn was elected as the Democratic nominee, the Illinois Green Party nominee was attorney and 2006 nominee Rich Whitney, the Republican nominee was State Senator Bill Brady, the Libertarian Party nominee was Lex Green, and Scott Lee Cohen ran as an independent.

Quinn was elected to a full term in a very close race, defeating Brady by only about 32,000 votes with Brady carrying 98 of the state's 102 counties. Prior to the general election, the primary election in February 2010 featured extremely close races between candidates for the two largest parties' nominations. Quinn warded off a challenge by Comptroller Dan Hynes by a margin of about 8,300 votes, while Brady won the Republican nomination on the strength of fewer than 200 votes in a fractured seven-way race. This was the first time Gallatin County went Republican for the governor level since 1920. The election marked the first time since 1852 that the Democrats won three consecutive gubernatorial elections in Illinois. This is also the first gubernatorial election since 1990 in which the winner was of the same party as the incumbent president.

Election information
The primaries and general elections coincided with those for federal elections (Senate and House), as well as those for other state offices. The election was part of the 2010 Illinois elections.

Turnout

For the primaries, turnout for the gubernatorial primaries was 22.21%, with 1,688,297 votes cast and turnout for the lieutenant gubernatorial primaries was 20.10% with 1,527,782 votes cast. For the general election, turnout was 49.69%, with 3,729,989 votes cast.

Democratic primaries
Quinn defeated Hynes by just under 9,000 votes, while Cohen won an upset over establishment candidates by just over 3% campaigning as a political outsider.

Governor

Candidates
 Daniel Hynes, Illinois State Comptroller and candidate for the U.S. Senate in 2004
 Pat Quinn, incumbent governor

Debates
Democratic candidates Quinn and Hynes debated on January 19. WSIU Public Broadcasting (WSIU (FM)/WSIU-TV) at Southern Illinois University and Illinois Public Media (WILL AM/FM/TV) at the University of Illinois at Urbana-Champaign also co-sponsored two gubernatorial primary election debates. Pat Quinn and Dan Hynes debated on January 21, 2010.

Polling

Results

Lieutenant Governor

Candidates
Mike Boland, member of the Illinois House of Representatives
Thomas Michael Castillo
Scott Lee Cohen, Pawnbroker
Rickey R. Hendon, Illinois State Senator
Terry Link, Illinois State Senator
Arthur Turner, member of the Illinois House of Representatives

Results

Aftermath
Scott Lee Cohen was replaced as the Democratic lieutenant gubernatorial nominee by former Carbondale City Councilwoman Sheila Simon after he withdrew due to allegations of abuse toward his wife and other charges.

Republican primaries
As on the Democratic side, both the gubernatorial and lieutenant gubernatorial primaries were extremely close, though moreso. Brady defeated Dillard by 0.02%, while Plummer defeated Murphy by just 0.65%.

Governor

Candidates

Declared
Adam Andrzejewski, businessman
Bill Brady, State Senator and candidate for governor in 2006 
Kirk Dillard, State Senator
Andy McKenna, businessman, former chairman of the Republican Party of Illinois and candidate for the U.S. Senate in 2004
Dan Proft, political commentator
Jim Ryan, former Attorney General of Illinois and nominee for governor in 2002

Withdrew
Bob Schillerstrom, chairman of the DuPage County Board

Results

Lieutenant Governor

Candidates
Dennis W. Cook, President of Consolidated District 230 Board of Education
Brad Cole, mayor of Carbondale
Matt Murphy, Illinois State Senator
Jason Plummer, chairman of the Madison County Republican Party
Don Tracy, corporate attorney
Randy A. White Sr., Hancock County Commissioner

Withdrawn
Dave Winters, Illinois State Representative

Results

Green primaries

Governor

Candidates
Rich Whitney, nominee for governor in 2006

Results

Lieutenant Governor

Candidates
Don Crawford

Results

General election

Candidates
Pat Quinn (Democratic) (campaign website): Incumbent governor who assumed office after the impeachment of Rod Blagojevich; sought a full term in 2010. Quinn was previously Revenue Director for the City of Chicago, state treasurer (1990-1994), and an unsuccessful candidate for the Democratic nomination for U.S. Senator (1996), Illinois Secretary of State (1994), and lieutenant governor (1998).
Bill Brady (Republican) (campaign website): state senator, real estate and construction businessman, unsuccessful candidate for the Republican nomination for governor in 2006
 Rich Whitney (Green): Illinois Green Party's 2006 nominee for governor
 Lex Green (Libertarian) (archived campaign website): Secretary of the McLean County Libertarian Party
 Scott Lee Cohen (Independent): former Democratic nominee for lieutenant governor in 2010 who was replaced by Sheila Simon after withdrawing due to allegations of abuse toward his wife and other charges. Cohen was reported to have been in a private meeting with Speaker Michael Madigan discussing his plan for running against Quinn.

Campaign
After the February 2 Democratic primary in which incumbent Governor Pat Quinn was nominated, attention was drawn to Scott Lee Cohen, the Democratic nominee for lieutenant governor. Illinois law required that candidates for governor and lieutenant governor run in separate primary elections, but run as a ticket in the November general election. Cohen was criticized for his having been charged with domestic battery, in which he was accused of holding a knife to the throat of an ex-girlfriend who was also a convicted prostitute. Cohen was also accused by his ex-wife of physical abuse and using illegally obtained anabolic steroids. Quinn and Dick Durbin, Illinois's senior U.S. Senator, both said that Cohen should withdraw his candidacy, which he did on February 7. Cohen ran as an independent candidate for the office of governor against Quinn.

On March 27, 2010, the Democratic State Central Committee chose a replacement candidate, Sheila Simon. Dan Hynes, who placed second in the gubernatorial primary, denied interest in replacing Cohen on the ticket. Other names suggested included State Representative Art Turner, who placed second to Cohen in the Democratic primary and then finished second to Simon in committee balloting on March 27, 2010; State Senators Rickey Hendon and Terry Link, State Representative Mike Boland, and electrician Thomas Castillo, all of whom also ran in the primary; U.S. Department of Veterans Affairs official Tammy Duckworth; and State Representative Julie Hamos were suggested as possible replacements. Jeff Melvin, a 21-year retired army veteran, also applied to the open nominating call for the Democratic lieutenant governor position.

At one point during the campaign, Democrat Pat Quinn, struggling to make up ground facing poor polling numbers against Brady, accused his Republican opponent of supporting a bill to kill puppies. In fact, the bill regulated shelters' practices when they euthanize animals. Quinn struggled to shake off Blagojevich's scandals, leading to poor polling numbers throughout the campaign. This was despite Quinn denouncing Blagojevich. Quinn trailed Brady by more than 10 points at times, despite Illinois being a deeply Democratic state.

A central issue in the campaign was the state income tax. Quinn advocated for a one percentage point – or 33 percent – increase in the state's income tax to primarily fund education, while Brady called for a 10 percent across the board cut in state government and placing the State Board of Education under the governor's control.

Predictions

Polling

Results
Even though Brady won 98 out of the 102 counties, Quinn narrowly prevailed. Brady won almost everywhere in the state, including all of the collar counties of the Chicago suburbs. Quinn initially had a large lead when results first began to come in, as heavily populated areas tend to report their votes faster. However, once the more suburban and rural areas came in Brady narrowed the gap significantly. Quinn's huge win in Cook County proved too much for Brady to overcome, however. Brady conceded defeat later the following day on November 3, when it became clear he would lose. Quinn's win was ranked by Politico as the 7th biggest upset of the 2010 elections.

See also
 Rod Blagojevich corruption charges
 2010 United States Senate elections in Illinois
 2010 United States House of Representatives elections in Illinois

References

External links
 Illinois State Board of Elections
 Official candidate list
 Illinois gubernatorial election, 2010 at Ballotpedia

2010
Gubernatorial, 2010
Illinois